The Coronado Island Film Festival (CIFF) is an annual film festival based in Coronado, a resort city across the San Diego Bay from downtown San Diego. It consists of a four-day festival in November – and a monthly year-round "Classic Movie Series" – at venues across the island including the iconic Hotel Del Coronado, once known as Hollywood's Playground.

History 
Film critic and author Leonard Maltin has served as Honorary Head Juror since the inaugural event in 2016.

On November 11, 2018, Jack Lemmon's son Chris, an actor and entertainer in his own right, fell seriously ill due to a lung condition at the festival. He was unable to accept an award on behalf of his father at the Hotel Del Coronado because he had to receive an immediate double lung transplant.

Notable Films 

The first opening night film in 2015 was The Finest Hours starring Chris Pine. In 2017, Darkest Hour starring Gary Oldman opened the festival. In 2021, notable films included C'mon C'mon (Opening Night), King Richard (Centerpiece) and Julia (Closing Night). In 2021, Pig and 7 Days won the Audience and Jury awards respectively. In 2022, the audience award for Best Narrative Feature went to She Said.

Notable appearances 
Notable attendees and award winners include Jacqueline Bissett, Geena Davis, Andy García, Vanna White, musicians Stephen Bishop and Vince Giordano, author/Navy Seal Marcus Luttrell, Mayes Rubeo, Gabriel Beristain and Tim Reid. Posthumous honorees represented by family members have included Jack Lemmon, Gene Kelly and Errol Flynn.

Awards 
Founded in 2016, The Festival offers awards in several categories called "Hubbells" named after its sculptor James Hubbell.  Cash awards called "Hubbells" in three categories: 
 The Dale St. Denis Award that honors the Best Woman Filmmaker; 
 The Dr. George Sanger Award that honors the Best Student Film; and 
 The Ken Fitzgerald and Ruby Carr Emerald Award.

The Leonard Maltin Tribute Award 
On November 14, 2020, the festival announced a new top award, presented by Leonard Maltin to director Chloé Zhao for "groundbreaking achievement" on her latest film Nomadland. In 2022, the award was presented to Bull Durham director Ron Shelton.

References

External links 

 Coronado Island Film Festival

Film festivals in San Diego
Film festivals established in 2015